Alastair "Ali" Jackson (born 17 November 1988) is a Northern Irish racing driver.

Jackson raced in the Asian Formula Three Championship in 2006 and finished 3rd in points with four victories, becoming the youngest driver to win in series history. In 2007 he drove part-time in the British Formula Three national class for Räikkönen Robertson Racing and finished 9th in points and made 10 additional starts in the British F3 International Series  and competed in the F3 Masters at Circuit Zandvoort and finished 22nd. In 2008 he competed part-time in the British F3 International class and finished 17th in points. After nine races he switched teams from Räikkönen Robertson to Ultimate Motorsport. In 2009 he has signed on to drive for Guthrie Meyer Racing in the Firestone Indy Lights Series. After the first oval race of the season at Kansas Speedway which saw Alistair getting caught in two crashes, severely damaging two cars, one teammate Jesse Mason being involved in a separate hard incident, and second teammate Sean Guthrie being suspended indefinitely for driving too fast through an accident scene and then refusing to respond to the black flag, Jackson left Guthrie-Meyer and signed on with RLR-Andersen Racing for the remainder of the season, however his car failed to appear at the penultimate round of the championship at Chicagoland Speedway, ending his season. His best finish was sixth at Long Beach and he finished 16th in points.

References

External links
Ali Jackson official website
Ali Jackson dominates wet 2006 AF3 Zhuhai Leg

1988 births
Living people
Racing drivers from Northern Ireland
Asian Formula Three Championship drivers
British Formula Three Championship drivers
Indy Lights drivers

Rahal Letterman Lanigan Racing drivers
Double R Racing drivers